Viola Township is a township in Osceola County, Iowa, USA. 
Viola Township is located on the Minnesota-Iowa border.

History
Viola Township was originally called Fenton Township, and under the latter name established in 1872.

References

Townships in Osceola County, Iowa
Townships in Iowa
Populated places established in 1872